Rockland Lake may refer to:

Places
 Rockland Lake, a lake in Rockland County, New York
 The unincorporated hamlet of Rockland Lake, New York, a former populated place located on the shores of Rockland Lake
 Rockland Lake State Park, a state park near the Hudson River in Rockland County, New York, within which Rockland Lake is located

Other
 Rockland Lake ice, ice sourced from Rockland Lake largely by the Knickerbocker Ice Company, which dominated ice harvesting and distribution for New York City during the 19th century